Starihov Vrh is a settlement south of Semič in southeastern Slovenia. The area is part of the historical region of Lower Carniola. The Municipality of Semič is now included in the Southeast Slovenia Statistical Region.

Church
The local church, built on a hill with a cemetery east of the settlement, is dedicated to Saint Roch and belongs to the Parish of Semič. It dates to the 17th century and was mentioned by Johann Weikhard von Valvasor in his Glory of the Duchy of Carniola.

References

External links
Starihov Vrh at Geopedia

Populated places in the Municipality of Semič